El Negaila is a city in Matrouh Governorate, Egypt.

Populated places in Matrouh Governorate